Today You Die is a 2005 American action film directed and shot by Don E. FauntLeRoy. The film stars Steven Seagal, who also producer with Randall Emmett, George Furla and Danny Lerner. It co-stars Treach, Sarah Buxton, Mari Morrow, Nick Mancuso and Robert Miano. The film was released on direct-to-DVD in the United States on September 13, 2005.

Plot
Harlan Banks (Steven Seagal) is a Robin Hood-esque thief who has always picked his own jobs and tried to pull heists that would leave him room to help out others. The work keeps getting riskier, and at the urging of his girlfriend Jada (Mari Morrow), Banks has decided to pull one final job, going in with some men who are planning a $20 million robbery.

After the heist goes bad, Banks heads to Las Vegas, where Jada wants him to get a real job. On the way to town, Banks and Jada passed a children's hospital displaying a going out of business sign. Banks gets a job driving an armored car for a man, Max (Kevin Tighe). The job is not exactly legitimate, and Bruno (Robert Miano), Banks' partner for the job, shoots a security guard, resulting in a chase through the Las Vegas strip in the armored van.

However, Banks is stopped and sent to prison, where he befriends an inmate known as "Ice Kool" (Treach). With Ice's help, Banks escapes, determined to hunt Max down. Along the way, Banks meets a federal agent named Saunders (Nick Mancuso), and it turns out that Saunders, who is in league with Max, is the man behind the setup. So Banks sets out to take down both Saunders and Max with a job.

Cast

Legal troubles
The producers of Today You Die filed lawsuits against Seagal because of experiences during the filming. Producers at Nu Image and Kill Master Productions alleged that Seagal, while filming this and Mercenary for Justice, arrived at the set late, left early, and re-wrote scripts without their permission, among other things. However, Seagal disputed the suit, and he countersued against producers, claiming fraud and breach of contract. , it appears the legal issues had not been resolved.

Home media
The DVD of the film was released in Region 1 in the United States on September 13, 2005, and also Region 2 in the United Kingdom on 10 July 2006. It was distributed by Sony Pictures Home Entertainment.

References

External links
 
 

2005 films
2005 action films
2005 direct-to-video films
American films about revenge
American action films
Direct-to-video action films
Films shot in Bulgaria
Films shot in Nevada
Films shot in the Las Vegas Valley
MoviePass Films films
Nu Image films
Sony Pictures direct-to-video films
Films directed by Don E. FauntLeRoy
2000s English-language films
2000s American films